Aframomum mala is a species of plant in the ginger family, Zingiberaceae. It was first described by Karl Moritz Schumann and Adolf Engler, and was given its current name by Karl Moritz Schumann.

References 

mala